Girlguiding North East England is one of the nine Regions and Countries of Girlguiding UK. The regional office is in Huntington, near York.

Counties
Girlguiding North East England is subdivided into 17 Girlguiding UK Counties. These do not correspond to the counties defined by the British government.

Cleveland
Durham North
Durham South
East Yorkshire
Leeds
Lincolnshire North
Newcastle upon Tyne
North Tyneside
North Yorkshire North East
North Yorkshire South
North Yorkshire West
Northumberland
Sheffield
South Yorkshire
West Yorkshire North
West Yorkshire South
West Yorkshire West

The 'Spirit of Guiding'

The 'Spirit of Guiding' is the region's narrowboat. It is based on the Rochdale Canal at Todmorden and is hired out to Guide and Senior Section groups.

South Yorkshire Guide House

South Yorkshire Guide House is located in the Scout Association's Hesley Wood Outdoor Activities Centre. It provides accommodation and an indoor area for activities.

Whiteley Woods Outdoor Activity Centre

Whiteley Woods Outdoor Activity Centre is located 3 miles South West of Sheffield city centre, just off the main road to Ringinglow. (Grid Ref. 307846 SK 2838 OS Number 110)

There are five campsites with wet weather shelters, two buildings for holidays offering accommodation for 24 and 31 people, including many disability-friendly features, a large barn with an open fireplace and a notice board to display charts etc., a meeting room for 12–15 people and a camp shop. A variety of activities, including Archery; Back Woods Cooking; Camping; Canoeing; Chess; Climbing Wall; Draughts; Games Chest; Games Equipment; Grass Sledding; Holidays; Hopscotch; Noughts and Crosses; Orienteering; Parachute Games; Picnicking; Pioneering; Pond Dipping; Quizzes; Trails and Treasure Hunts; Adventure Course; All Weather Table Tennis, are available.

Montserrat
An eruption of Mount Soufrière in 1997 destroyed the Guide Headquarters on Montserrat. It had been open less than ten years. In 2007, the rebuilding of Headquarters began using money raised by Guides in the North East region.

See also

Scouting in North East England
Scouting in Yorkshire and the Humber
The Scout Association

References

Girlguiding